The 2018 Japanese Regional Leagues were a competition between parallel association football leagues ranking at the bottom of the Japan Football League.
Statistics of Japanese Regional Leagues in the 2018 season.

Champions list

League standings

Hokkaido

Tohoku

Kantō

Hokushinetsu

Tōkai

Kansai

Chūgoku

Shikoku

Kyushu

References
RSSSF

2018
2018 in Japanese football leagues